Ardozyga plinthactis is a species of moth in the family Gelechiidae. It was described by Edward Meyrick in 1904. It is found in Australia, where it has been recorded from New South Wales.

The forewings are white, sprinkled with pale ochreous and dark fuscous. The markings are pale ochreous mixed or tinged with ferruginous and irrorated with blackish. There is a small spot at the base of the costa, and another at one-fifth, as well as a larger and more blackish oblique semi-oval spot on the costa before the middle and a mark on the base of the dorsum. A small spot is found on the fold at one-third and there is an irregular patch above the tornus, as well as a row of undefined spots beneath the posterior third of the costa and along the termen. The hindwings are pale grey.

References

Ardozyga
Moths described in 1904
Taxa named by Edward Meyrick
Moths of Australia